An-Nur Great Mosque is a mosque located in Pekanbaru, Riau, Indonesia. Construction began in 1963 and was completed in 1968. The mosque can accommodate about 4,500 worshipers. It is one of the largest mosques in Indonesia. The mosque has influences from various architectural styles: Malay, Turkish, Arabic and Indian.

History 

The mosque was finished on 20 October 1968. It was inaugurated by Arifin Ahmad, the Governor of Riau. In 2000, it was renovated during the time of Governor Saleh Djasit, with its area tripled from 4 hectares to 12.6 hectares. Due to the renovation, football stadium Hang Tuah was demolished.

The mosque was once a campus for the Faculty of Usul al-Din State Institute of Islamic studies (IAIN) Sultan Syarif Kasim Pekabaru from its founding until 1973. IAIN Sultan Syarif Kasim State Islamic University is now the Sultan Syarif Kasim (UIN SUSKA) Pekanbaru.

Architecture 

Architecturally, An-Nur is similar to the Taj Mahal. The mosque was designed by IR. Roseno. The building consists of three floors; the top level is used for prayer and the lower level for offices and meeting rooms. The upper part consists of large rooms and a Hall. Downstairs is the Secretariat of the Board and classroom space. The building is equipped with escalators connecting floors one and two.

See also 

 Indonesian architecture
 Islamic architecture
 Islam in Indonesia
 List of mosques in Indonesia

References 

Mosques in Indonesia
Buildings and structures in Riau
Mosques completed in 1968